, is a popular Japanese female singer-songwriter. Her second single "Be Strong" was used as the first opening theme of anime series Kenichi: The Mightiest Disciple.

Discography

Singles 
 "Fall" (May 26, 2006)
 "Be Strong" (February 7, 2007) ranked 197th at Oricon singles charts
 "Perfect Fit/Deep Forest" (September 24, 2008,) ranked 166th at Oricon singles charts
 "Slave" (August 26, 2009)
 "Happiness" (November 4, 2009) featured in the video game Rune Factory 3

Albums 
 Document (May 16, 2007,)
 Mysterious Circle (May 26, 2010)
 Red Blood Cell (March 8, 2013)

References

External links 
 

1985 births
Living people
Japanese women singer-songwriters
Japanese singer-songwriters
Musicians from Kanagawa Prefecture
21st-century Japanese singers
21st-century Japanese women singers